The SDEC R Series engines are  Inline-4 diesel engines from SDEC. They are light-duty truck engines based on licensed VM Motori designs.

Nomenclature
SDEC R Series engines use a non-fixed naming convention:
 The first two characters "SC" signifies SDEC-Shangai Diesel Engine Co.
 The next two characters refer to the displacement of the engine; "25" = 2.5L, "28" = 2.8L. 
 The next characters indicate peak metric horsepower produced.
 The Q letter indicates the emission standard. "Q4" = Euro/China 4, "Q5A" = Euro 5a, "Q6" = Euro 6.

SC25R
2.5L light-duty truck engine based on VM Motori RA 425 DOHC.

Applications

 Joylong A4
LDV Maxus/Maxus V80 (2011-present)

SC28R

Light-duty truck engines based on VM Motori RA 428 DOHC. Based on a tunnel closed cylinder block design, 4-valves per cylinder, high pressure 1600bar BOSCH common rail system, aluminum alloy cylinder head, double overhead cam system and volute casing fixed geometry turbocharger or electronically controlled variable geometry turbocharger, complying with China/Euro 4, 5A and 6 emission standards.

Applications

Golden Dragon XML6700J15
King Long Kaige/Kingo
Joylong A-series 
Maxus T60 (2016-Present)
Yuejin SH108 type 2

See also
SDEC Engines

References

External links 
SDEC R Series Official site (Chinese)

Diesel engines by model
Straight-four engines